The 2016 Memphis Tigers football team represented the University of Memphis in the 2016 NCAA Division I FBS football season. The Tigers were led by first-year head coach Mike Norvell and played their home games at the Liberty Bowl Memorial Stadium in Memphis, Tennessee. The Tigers competed as a member of the West Division of the American Athletic Conference. They finished the season 8–5, 5–3 in American Athletic play to finish in a tie for third place in the West Division. They were invited to the Boca Raton Bowl where they lost to Western Kentucky.

Schedule

Game summaries

Southeast Missouri State

Kansas

Bowling Green

at Ole Miss

Temple

at Tulane

at Navy

Tulsa

at SMU

South Florida

at Cincinnati

Houston

vs. Western Kentucky–Boca Raton Bowl

Personnel

Depth chart

Roster

References

Memphis
Memphis Tigers football seasons
Memphis Tigers football